Peter Chapple-Hyam (born 2 April 1963 in Leamington Spa, Warwickshire, England) is a Thoroughbred racehorse trainer. He trained Dr Devious to win The Derby in 1992 and repeated the feat with Authorized in 2007. He managed two Group One wins in his first season as a trainer in 1991. Away from racing he is a keen supporter of West Bromwich Albion F.C.

Chapple-Hyam trained in Hong Kong between 1999 and 2003.

Major wins

 Great Britain
 2,000 Guineas - (1) - Rodrigo de Triano (1992)
 Champion Stakes - (2) - Rodrigo de Triano (1992), Spectrum (1995)
 Derby - (2) - Dr Devious (1992), Authorized (2007)
 Dewhurst Stakes - (1) - Dr Devious (1991)
 International Stakes - (2) - Rodrigo de Triano (1992), Authorized (2007)
 Middle Park Stakes - (2) - Rodrigo de Triano (1991), Dutch Art (2006)
 Racing Post Trophy - (3) - Commander Collins (1998), Authorized (2006), Marcel (2015)

 France
 Critérium de Saint-Cloud - (1) - Polaris Flight (1995)
 Grand Critérium - (1) - Revoque (1996)
 Poule d'Essai des Poulains - (1) - Victory Note (1998)
 Prix de l'Abbaye de Longchamp - (1) - Carmine Lake (1997)
 Prix du Cadran - (1) - Chief Contender (1997)
 Prix Morny - (1) - Dutch Art (2006)
 Prix de la Salamandre - (1) - Revoque (1996)

 Ireland
 Irish 2,000 Guineas - (3) - Rodrigo de Triano (1992), Turtle Island (1994), Spectrum (1995)
 Irish Champion Stakes - (1) - Dr Devious (1992)
 Phoenix Stakes - (1) - Turtle Island (1993)

 Italy
 Derby Italiano - (2) - White Muzzle (1993), Single Empire (1997)
 Gran Premio d'Italia - (1) - Close Conflict (1994)
 Gran Premio del Jockey Club - (1) - Court of Honour (1995)
 Premio Parioli - (1) - Prince Arthur (1995)

References

External links
 Breeders' Cup biography

1963 births
British racehorse trainers
Living people
People from Leamington Spa